Jora de Mijloc is a commune in Orhei District, Moldova. It is composed of four villages: Jora de Jos, Jora de Mijloc, Jora de Sus and Lopatna.

References

Communes of Orhei District